Micrurus averyi, also known commonly as Avery's coral snake and the black-headed coral snake, is a species of coral snake, a venomous snake in the genus Micrurus of the family Elapidae. The species is indigenous to northern South America.

Etymology
The specific name, averyi, is in honor of American financier Sewell Avery, who funded the expedition during which the holotype was collected.

Geographic range
M. averyi is found in southern Guyana (in the headwaters of Courantyne River), southern Suriname, and Brazil (Pará, Amazonas, Mato Grosso).

Habitat

Description
The head of M. averyi is almost completely black, and there is no nuchal ring. The relatively few black rings on the body are not grouped in triads.

Reproduction
M. averyi is oviparous.

References

Further reading
Freiberg M (1982). Snakes of South America. Hong Kong: T.F.H. Publications. 189 pp. . (Micrurus averyi, p. 114).
Schmidt KP (1939). "A New Coral Snake from British Guiana". Zoological Series of Field Museum of Natural History 24 (6): 45–47. (Micrurus averyi, new species).
Vanzolini PE (1985). "Micrurus averyi Schmidt, 1939, in central Amazonia (Serpentes, Elapidae)". Papéis Avulsos de Zoologia, Museu de Zoologia da Universidade de São Paulo 36 (8): 77–85.

averyi
Snakes of South America
Reptiles of Brazil
Reptiles of Guyana
Reptiles of Suriname
Reptiles described in 1939
Taxa named by Karl Patterson Schmidt